Women at War is a 1943 American short drama film directed by Jean Negulesco and starring Faye Emerson. It was nominated for an Academy Award at the 16th Academy Awards for Best Short Subject (Two-Reel).

Cast
 Faye Emerson as Anastasia 'Stormy' Hart
 Dorothy Day as Lorna Travis
 Marjorie Hoshelle as Sgt. Ramsey
 Virginia Christine as Mary Sawyer
 Robert Warwick as Maj. Gen. 'Blood and Thunder' Travis

References

External links
 

1943 films
1943 drama films
1943 short films
American war drama films
American drama short films
Films directed by Jean Negulesco
1940s war drama films
1940s English-language films
1940s American films